Chaetolopha pseudooxyntis is a moth in the family Geometridae. It is found in Australia (Queensland).

The wings are pale brown with a large dark brown triangle outlined in white on the forewings.

The larvae probably feed on Polypodiophyta species.

References

Moths described in 2002
Endemic fauna of Australia
Larentiinae